Dolovo is a village in Serbia. It is situated in the Pančevo municipality, in the South Banat District, Vojvodina province. The village has a Serb ethnic majority and its population is 6,146 (2011 census). The place name means location of troughs.

Historical population
1948: 5,983
1953: 6,273
1961: 6,766
1971: 6,582
1981: 6,836
1991: 6,790
2002: 5,346 (5,346 Serbs, 927 Romanians, 83 Romani people and 479 Others)

See also
List of cities, towns and villages in Serbia
List of cities, towns and villages in Vojvodina

Gallery

References

External links

Dolovo on the Official Website by the municipality of Pančevo (Serbian)
History of the Serbian Orthodox Church Saint Nicholas on the Website by Eparchy of Banat (Serbian)

Populated places in Serbian Banat
Populated places in South Banat District
Pančevo